Jake Gibson (born 7 August 1997) is a New Zealand cricketer. He made his List A debut on 5 February 2020, for Northern Districts in the 2019–20 Ford Trophy, taking a five-wicket haul. He made his first-class debut on 23 October 2021, for Otago in the 2021–22 Plunket Shield season. He made his Twenty20 debut on 28 November 2021, for Otago in the 2021–22 Men's Super Smash.

References

External links
 

1997 births
Living people
New Zealand cricketers
Northern Districts cricketers
Otago cricketers
Place of birth missing (living people)